This is a list of French television related events from 2009.

Events
9 June - Soan wins the seventh series of Nouvelle Star.
25 September - Emilie Nefnaf wins series 3 of Secret Story.
28 September - Launch of the French version of The X Factor.
28 September - Sébastien Agius wins the first series of X Factor.
30 December - Dance troupe Les Echos-liés win the fourth series of La France a un incroyable talent.

Debuts

28 September - X Factor (2009-2011)

Television shows

1940s
Le Jour du Seigneur (1949–present)

1950s
Présence protestante (1955-)

1970s
30 millions d'amis (1976-2016)

2000s
Nouvelle Star (2003-2010, 2012–present)
Plus belle la vie (2004–present)
La France a un incroyable talent (2006–present)
Secret Story (2007–present)

Ending this year

Births

Deaths

See also
2009 in France